The 2010 Barnsley Metropolitan Borough Council election took place on 6 May 2010 to elect members of Barnsley Metropolitan Borough Council in South Yorkshire, England. One third of the council was up for election and the Labour party stayed in overall control of the council.

After the election, the composition of the council was
Labour 37
Barnsley Independent Group 18
Conservative 6
Liberal Democrat 1
Independent 1

Background
The previous election in 2008 saw Labour's majority reduced to just one seat. The Barnsley Independent Group formed the main opposition with 22 seats compared to 32 for Labour, with Conservatives, a couple of other independents and 1 Liberal Democrat making up the council.

Election result
The results saw Labour increase their majority from 1 to 11 seats after making 5 gains from the Barnsley Independent Group.

Ward results

References

2010 English local elections
May 2010 events in the United Kingdom
2010
2010s in South Yorkshire